The Porter-Crawford House, at 1208 22nd Ave. in Meridian, Mississippi, is a historic Queen Anne style house that was built in 1912.  It was listed on the National Register of Historic Places in 1979 as part of a Multiple Property Submission.

It was deemed notable as "the only remaining example on 22nd Avenue of the Queen Anne style, a style once dominant on Silk Stocking Row."

References 

Houses on the National Register of Historic Places in Mississippi
Queen Anne architecture in Mississippi
Houses completed in 1912
Houses in Meridian, Mississippi
1912 establishments in Mississippi
National Register of Historic Places in Lauderdale County, Mississippi